The Tornado outbreak sequence of June 1966 was a series of tornado outbreaks which occurred between June 2 and June 12. The nearly two week event of severe weather was mainly concentrated in the Midwestern (Great Plains) region of the United States, but was widely spread out to areas as far south as Texas and Florida, and as far east as New York.

The most destructive tornado of this event occurred on the early evening of Wednesday, June 8, 1966, when Topeka, Kansas was struck by an F5 rated tornado. It started on the southwest side of town, moving northeast, passing through several subdivisions and over a local landmark named Burnett's Mound. 57 tornadoes were confirmed during the 11-day span, which left 18 people dead and 543 injured (16 of the 18 deaths and 450 of the injuries were attributed to the Topeka tornado).

Confirmed tornadoes

June 3 event

June 4 event

June 5 event

June 6 event

June 7 event

June 8 event

June 9 event

June 10 event

June 11 event

June 12 event

Topeka, Kansas

According to a local Native American legend, Burnett's Mound (a local landmark that was named after Potawatomi Indian chief Abram Burnett, and also believed to be an ancient Native American burial ground) was thought to protect the city from tornadoes, suggesting that the  hill would cause a tornado that was approaching Topeka to disintegrate. A few years earlier, a water tower had been built directly on the mound, which sparked controversy among Topeka residents who felt it could impede the mound's reputed protective effect. Ten other tornadoes had struck the city since state records began in 1889, but the 1966 tornado was worse than any of the others.

The Topeka tornado began developing at 6:55 p.m. The National Weather Service could not detect the developing tornado on radar as the Topeka forecast office used a modified military radar that was donated by the U.S. government after World War II. While it was state-of-the-art for the time, it had limited ability to detect tornadic activity compared to Doppler weather radar. Around 7:30 p.m., a 1/4 to 1/2-mile (400–800 m) wide tornado tracked into the southwest side of town, moving northeast, and passed over Burnett's Mound. Bill Kurtis, then a fill-in reporter at WIBW-TV (channel 13; then a hybrid CBS/ABC/NBC affiliate, now CBS) delivered the message to take shelter from the devastating storm by telling viewers calmly but sternly, "for God's sake, take cover!"

After broadcasting a take-cover report on the air while driving down the winding road on Burnett's Mound with the tornado approaching his direction, Rick Douglass, a reporter for radio station WREN (1250 AM, now KYYS), attempted to take shelter under an overpass, while trying to do a second live report on the storm. Douglass was carried by the tornado, becoming airborne for a few seconds, and was dropped over one block away. Douglass, whose clothes were ripped from his body, was pushed by the strong winds along the ground until the tornado passed on to make a six-block swath across Topeka. Douglass was found with dirt and debris covering his body. When he arrived at an area hospital, a nurse placed a cover over Douglass's face – believing he had perished. In an interview with The History Channel's Wrath of God, Douglass stated that he then pulled off the cover, resulting in the attending nurse wincing in reaction, Douglass found shards of debris in his skin for several years after the tornado and was left with a smell he described in the interview as "a mix of blood, guts, wood and metal" for several weeks.

The tornado first struck residential areas, cleanly sweeping away entire rows of homes and hurling vehicles hundreds of yards through the air. Grass was scoured from the ground according to eyewitnesses. Washburn University took a direct hit, and many large stone buildings on campus were badly damaged or destroyed. A 300-pound section of stone wall was torn from one building and thrown two miles away. One vehicle on campus was reportedly lofted over the top of the university's ROTC building, before coming to rest on the 50-yard line of the football field. The tornado ripped through the central part of the city, hitting the downtown area. Buses were crushed when the transportation barn was collapsed by the tornado, and trains on the Santa Fe Railway were overturned. Most of the downtown buildings were badly damaged or had windows blown out. Cars were flipped and tossed, and streets were blocked with debris. Many workers at the AT&T building downtown took shelter after a co-worker warned them of the approaching tornado, which could not be heard through the soundproof operator's room. The building incurred only light damage. The Kansas State Capitol building was also damaged when debris struck the dome removing one of the copper panels.

As the storm raged through the downtown area, meteorologists at the National Weather Service Topeka forecast office, located at Philip Billard Municipal Airport, took shelter as the tornado tracked through the airport, flipping over several airplanes. At 7:29 p.m., 34 minutes after it touched down, the tornado dissipated after ripping through the airport. By this time, the tornado had traversed  of the city, with a damage path width of 1/2 mile (800 m). The most intense damage occurred in residential areas on the east side of town, due to the closely spaced housing units. Homes and other buildings along the tornado's path were obliterated, and the National Weather Service Topeka forecast office years later rated the tornado at F5 on the Fujita scale.

Then-mayor Chuck Wright later issued a decree that those caught looting would be shot on sight. The Kansas National Guard was called in. Streets in devastated areas of the city were filled with sightseers checking out the ruins of homes and businesses, which hampered efforts from first responders to find those missing under rubble. Families of victims also came to the scene to try to find them.

The total damage estimate was put at $250 million ($ million in ) making it one of the costliest tornadoes in U.S. history. , with inflation factored in, the Topeka tornado stood as the seventh costliest tornado on record. 820 homes were destroyed and 3,000 others were damaged. 250 businesses were destroyed and 2,390 were damaged including a major shopping center. 330 of the damaged homes and businesses suffered major damage and the other 5,000 received lesser degrees of damage. Hundreds of apartments were destroyed. Many government buildings, public buildings, other structures and much other property were damaged or destroyed. 

Overall, 16 people were killed, and many others were injured. However, it is believed that had the tornado hit during school and work hours or during the night, that as many as 5,000 people would have been killed. Bill Kurtis was credited for saving many lives with his urgent message to take cover.

Casualties

See also
List of North American tornadoes and tornado outbreaks
List of tornadoes striking downtown areas

References

Notes

External links
 Tornado Damage Patterns in Topeka, Kansas, June 8, 1966 (Monthly Weather Review, Vol. 95, No. 6)
 Comments on “Tornado Damage Patterns in Topeka, Kansas, June 8, 1966” (Monthly Weather Review, Vol. 96, No. 3)
 Reply (Monthly Weather Review, Vol. 96, No. 3)
 NWS Topeka page
 Topeka Capital-Journal online
 Access Menninger photographs and documents on Kansas Memory, the Kansas State Historical Society's digital portal
 The Topeka Tornado of 1966: Never Before Published Damage Photos

F5 tornadoes
Tornadoes of 1966
Tornadoes in South Dakota
Tornadoes in Wisconsin
Tornadoes in Nebraska
Tornadoes in Minnesota
Tornadoes in Oklahoma
Tornadoes in Missouri
Tornadoes in Iowa
Tornadoes in Kentucky
Tornadoes in Florida
Tornadoes in Kansas
Tornadoes in Illinois
Tornadoes in Michigan
Tornadoes in New York (state)
Tornadoes in Texas
Shawnee County, Kansas
1966 natural disasters in the United States
June 1966 events in the United States